Charles Henri Nicod (28 January 1878, Levier, Doubs - December 1967) was a French architect active in the period between the two World Wars.  He was the winner of the Prix de Rome in 1907.  His works include the Hotel Majestic in Cannes.

1878 births
1967 deaths
People from Doubs
20th-century French architects
École des Beaux-Arts alumni
Prix de Rome for architecture
Officiers of the Légion d'honneur